Gliese 3685 is a star in the constellation of Leo. It is extremely faint; its apparent magnitude is 13.3, and can only be seen with a ten-inch (25 cm) telescope (see Limiting magnitude). Based on a parallax of 50.30 milliarcseconds, the system is located 65 light years (20 parsecs) away from the Earth.

This is a part of a binary star system consisting of two components separated by 24. The primary component, Gliese 3685 (also known as Gliese 3685 A), is a very old red dwarf that is also a flare star. A 20-minute flare was observed in 2004 by the GALEX satellite. Its companion, Gliese 3686, is another faint red dwarf with a spectral type of M5. It is also known as LP 613-50 and is also located roughly the same distance as its primary.

References

 

Leo (constellation)
M-type main-sequence stars
3685
Binary stars